Steel Angel Kurumi is a 1999 to 2001 Japanese anime series that was released in conjunction  with a manga series of the same name. Consisting of two television series and two original video animation (OVA) series, Steel Angel Kurumi was directed by Naohito Takahashi with scripts from Naruhisa Arakawa and produced by Oriental Light and Magic. Pony Canyon provided the music production and distributionfor the series. The first television series consists of 24 episodes and was broadcast on the private satellite network WOWOW from October 5, 1999 to April 4, 2000. It was followed by a four-episode OVA series titled Steel Angel Kurumi Encore which was released between January 7, 2000 and March 1, 2000. The second television series, set 75 years after the first series, was broadcast on the Japanese networks  TV Kanagawa, Chiba TV, Teletama, and SUN-TV from April 12, 2001 to June 28, 2001 for a total of 12 episodes. A second three-episode OVA series, titled Steel Angel Kurumi Zero, was released between April 18, 2001 and June 20, 2001.

Episodes

Television series

Steel Angel Kurumi

Steel Angel Kurumi 2

Original video animations

Steel Angel Kurumi Encore

Steel Angel Kurumi Zero

References 

Steel Angel Kurumi